An Italian charm bracelet also known in America as a nomination bracelet  is a series of individual modular links hooked together on a stretchy band to form a single charm bracelet. A typical Italian charm bracelet comprises eighteen charm links. Each link features a charm face (design or image) soldered onto the actual charm link.

History

The brand Nomination became known for its series of bracelets, which could be customized and personalised. The bracelet consisted of replaceable pieces that could be picked up and then modified.  In the 1990s, American tourists noticed the style and brought it back to the United States where the fashion caught on. The original Nomination bracelets were made of lightweight stainless steel and aimed primarily at young women, although the company also released models for men. The typology of jewels is known in other parts of the world with the English name "Italian charm bracelets".

References

Bracelets
Italian culture
1990s fashion
2000s fashion
2010s fashion